Nuestra Belleza San Luis Potosí 2010,  was held in Ex Convento de San Agustín, Xilitla, San Luis Potosí on July 31, 2010. At the conclusion of the final night of competition, Carmen Hernández of the capital city San Luis Potosí was crowned the winner. Hernández  was crowned by outgoing Nuestra Belleza San Luis Potosí titleholder, Sarahí Carrillo. Seven contestants competed for the state title.

Results

Placements

Judges
Patricia Drogueras - Contests Regional Coordinator of Nuestra Belleza México
Dr. Ángel Franco - Organizer for Mexico of Miss America Latina
Cesar Hache - Broker International of Bogamodels 
Abraham Palomo - Photographer
César Torres - Plastic Surgeon
Miguel Sánchez - Painter

Contestants

Contestants Notes
Carmen Hernández competed in the second Reina Internacional del Transporte pageant in Duitama, Colombia in January 2011 and won the Crown. At the time of her crown, broke the dress, revealing a breast for what the public immediately set his sights on it. Also she won the right to represent Mexico in Miss Princess of the World 2011 will be held in France.
Paola Lastras was invited by the Nuestra Belleza México organization to participate in the National Contest.

References

External links
Official Website

Nuestra Belleza México
2010 in Mexico
2010 beauty pageants